"Let Us All Unite and Celebrate Together" is the anthem of the African Union (AU). It was written as a poem titled "Proud to be African" by Ethiopian poet Tsegaye Gabre-Medhin, while the music was composed by Kenyan choral composer Arthur Mudogo Kemoli. It had served as the anthem of the former Organisation of African Unity since 1986 before being adopted by the newly formed Union in 2002.

History 
The anthem was written as a poem titled "Proud to be African" by Ethiopian poet Tsegaye Gabre-Medhin. Kenyan choral composer Arthur Mudogo Kemoli composed the anthem's music in Dakar, Senegal in 1986, and it was selected as the anthem of the AU's predecessor, the Organisation of African Unity (OAU), as part of a contest. The same year, the OAU honoured Tsegaye with the OAU African Unity Anthem Prize for writing the anthem.

After the AU's formation in 2002, it organised a contest to establish official symbols of the Union, including a flag, emblem and anthem. The competition's brief for the anthem included that its short form for official ceremonies (first stanzas or two verses and chorus) should not exceed one minute in length and that each entry should include lyrics, sheet music, a good recording and an explanatory note and be submitted in one of the working languages of the AU. The brief stated that the symbols should draw inspiration from a number of values including struggle, independence, labour, unity, justice and hope. The competition was to last until 25 April 2003, and the three best entries were to be presented and the symbols chosen at a session of the AU Assembly in Maputo, Mozambique, in July 2003, with the first-, second- and third-place winners receiving US$7,000, US$5,000 and US$3,000 cash prizes, respectively.

The competition did not attract many participants, and eventually the competition was abandoned and symbols adopted and/or formalised irrespective of it, including the OAU anthem, which was retained as the anthem of the new AU.

Lyrics

Notes

References

External links 
 African Union page on its symbols
 African Union Anthem

Anthems of organizations
African Union
African anthems
Songs about Africa